Yang Chao ; (born July 26, 1989 in Harbin, Heilongjiang) is a Chinese former competitive figure skater. He won three ISU Junior Grand Prix medals and finished in the top ten at two World Junior Championships. He is the 2009 and 2010 Chinese senior national bronze medalist.

Programs

Competitive highlights 
GP: Grand Prix; JGP: Junior Grand Prix

References

External links 

 

1989 births
Living people
Chinese male single skaters
Figure skaters from Harbin